Lino Selvatico (July 9, 1872 in Padua – 1924 in Roncade, Province of Treviso) was an Italian painter.

His father, Riccardo (born 1849), was a lawyer, poet, comedic dramatist, and politician, who intended his son to become a lawyer and legislator. Lino's brother, Luigi Selvatico (1873-1938), was also a painter. Luigi was nicknamed il gobbo Selvatico due to his physical ailment. Lino was a pupil of Cesare Laurenti, and was also influenced by his friend Ettore Tito. He also was known for art criticism. He painted mainly landscapes in oil and acquaforte. He exhibited two portraits at the third Venice Biennale in 1899. In 1926, the Biennale had a posthumous exhibit of 45 of his works, and in 1935, sixteen of his works. His works are displayed in the Moderna Art Galleries of Milan, Rome, Trieste, Udine, and Venice. He completed portraits of Countess Annina Morosini (1908, Venice, Galleria d'arte moderna) and the actress Emma Gramatica (1911, Piacenza, Galleria d'arte moderna Ricci-Oddi).

His brother Luigi participated in the 1897 Biennale of Venice.

References

1872 births
1924 deaths
19th-century Italian painters
Italian male painters
20th-century Italian painters
Painters from Bologna
19th-century Italian male artists
20th-century Italian male artists